All About Women (French: À propos de la femme) is a 1969 French-Canadian drama film directed by Claude Pierson and starring Marlène Alexandre, Astrid Frank and Marie-Christine Auferil.

Cast

References

Bibliography
 Michel Larouche & François Baby. L'aventure du cinéma québécois en France. XYZ, 1996.

External links

1969 films
1969 drama films
French drama films
Canadian drama films
1960s French-language films
French-language Canadian films
1960s Canadian films
1960s French films